Gustav Ernesaks (12 December 1908 – 24 January 1993) was an Estonian composer and a choir conductor.

Biography
Ernesaks was born in Perila, Peningi Parish. He played an integral role in the Singing Revolution and was one of the father figures of the Estonian Song Festival tradition. One of his songs, a setting of Lydia Koidula's poem Mu isamaa on minu arm, became an unofficial national anthem during the years of Estonian SSR. His performance of the song at the XVII Estonian Song Festival was one of the inspirations for Dmitri Shostakovich's 1970 a capella choral cycle, Loyalty. He dedicated the score to Ernesaks, who also premiered it in Tallinn. He also composed the Estonian SSR anthem used between 1945 and 1990.

In 1935, Ernesaks married Stella Merjam. They had three sons: Ott Ernesaks, Jüri Ernesaks and Peep Ernesaks. Stella died in 1973. Ernesaks died in Tallinn, aged 84. A statue of him was erected in 2004 on the Tallinn Song Festival Grounds.

Honours and awards
Soviet Union
 Hero of Socialist Labour (1974)
 People's Artist of the USSR (1956)
 Stalin Prizes;
2nd class (1947)
3rd class (1951) – for the opera Tormide rand ("The Coast of Storms"; 1949)
 Lenin Prize (1970)
 Order of Lenin, three times (1974, 1951, 1967)
 Order of the October Revolution (1978)
 Order of the Red Banner of Labour (1946)
 Order of the Badge of Honour, twice (1965, 1988)

Estonia
 Order of the Estonian Red Cross, 5th class (1938)
 Honoured Artist of the Estonian SSR (1942)
 People's Artist of the Estonian SSR (1947)
 State Prize of the Estonian SSR (1947, 1948, 1949, 1950, 1959, 1965)

References

1908 births
1993 deaths
People from Raasiku Parish
People from Kreis Harrien
Members of the Supreme Soviet of the Estonian Soviet Socialist Republic, 1955–1959
Members of the Supreme Soviet of the Estonian Soviet Socialist Republic, 1959–1963
Members of the Supreme Soviet of the Estonian Soviet Socialist Republic, 1963–1967
Members of the Supreme Soviet of the Estonian Soviet Socialist Republic, 1967–1971
Soviet composers
Soviet male composers
20th-century classical composers
Estonian choral conductors
Estonian opera composers
Soviet opera composers
Male classical composers
National anthem writers
20th-century Estonian composers
20th-century male musicians
20th-century conductors (music)
Estonian Academy of Music and Theatre alumni
Academic staff of the Estonian Academy of Music and Theatre
People's Artists of the USSR
People's Artists of the Estonian Soviet Socialist Republic
Heroes of Socialist Labour
Stalin Prize winners
Lenin Prize winners
Recipients of the Order of Lenin
Burials at Metsakalmistu